Nawabganj is a town and nagar panchayat in Hasanganj tehsil of Unnao district, Uttar Pradesh, India. It is located northeast of Unnao on the Lucknow-Kanpur road, near the Ajgain railway station. Founded in 1842 and first officially classified as a town for the 1981 census, Nawabganj once served as the seat of a tehsil under the Nawabs of Awadh and is today the headquarters of a community development block containing 124 villages.

Nawabganj is the site of Nawabganj Bird Sanctuary, which was established in 1984 at the site of a local lake. Designated as a protected Ramsar site since September 2019, the sanctuary is home to over 25,000 birds (including both resident and migratory populations) across some 220 species. Among the species present are the endangered Egyptian vulture and Pallas's fish eagle, as well as the vulnerable lesser adjutant and woolly-necked stork. Additionally, the sanctuary is home to larger mammals including the golden jackal and the jungle cat.

Nawabganj hosts a large annual fair at the end of Chait in honour of the goddesses Durga Devi and Kusahri Devi. The fair is one of the largest in the district, drawing visitors from Lucknow and Kanpur. The Durga temple is in Nawabganj, while the Kusahri temple is in the neighbouring village of Kusumbhi to the north. Major products manufactured in Nawabganj include fireworks, jaggery, and sweets. As of 2011, the town's population is 11,545, in 1,985 households.

History
Nawabganj was founded in 1842 by Amin-ud-Daulah, the prime minister of Oudh State, who also built a sarai and mosque here. Naubat Rai, the state's treasurer, was responsible for the construction of the tank. Under the Nawabs of Awadh, Nawabganj was the seat of a tehsil and also had a thana, but it declined in importance after the tehsil was relocated and the population shrank as a result: it was 3,123 in 1869, but by 1891 it had fallen to 2,840. The 1901 census recorded a population of 2,789, including a Muslim minority of about one-sixth of the total.

Demographics

According to the 2011 census, Nawabganj has a population of 11,545 people, in 1,985 households. The town's sex ratio is 934 females to every 1000 males;  5,968 of Nawabganj's residents are male (51.7%) and 5,577 are female (48.3%). The 0-6 age group makes up about 12.7% of the town's population; among this group, the sex ratio is 964, which is higher than the district urban average of 903. Members of Scheduled Castes make up 23.55% of the town's population and members of Scheduled Tribes make up 1.22%. The proportion of scheduled tribes in Nawabganj is the highest among towns in Unnao district. The town's literacy rate was 70.6% (counting only people age 7 and up); literacy was higher among men and boys (75.2%) than among women and girls (65.6%). The corresponding gap of 17.3% was the highest among towns in the district. The scheduled castes literacy rate is 57.2% (63.5% among men and boys, and 50.7% among women and girls).

In terms of employment, 25.2% of Nawabganj residents were classified as main workers (i.e. people employed for at least 6 months per year) in 2011. Marginal workers (i.e. people employed for less than 6 months per year) made up 3.1%, and the remaining 71.7% were non-workers. Employment status varied substantially according to gender, with 49.8% of men being either main or marginal workers, compared to only 5.3% of women.

Transport
The train station is at the nearby village of Kusambi, 1.5 km north of Nawabganj. There are 7.4 km of roads in the town, and it is connected by bus routes with other towns.

Communications
Nawabganj's PIN code is 209859 and its postal head office is Nawabganj (Unnao).

Tourism
Nawabganj Bird Sanctuary, a bird sanctuary (chandra shekhar azad) and nature reserve, is located near the town. Shri Durga Mata temple is located in the town. Shri Kushahari Mata temple is 3 k.m. away from the town near kusumbhi railway station.

Villages
Nawabganj CD block has the following 124 villages:

References

Cities and towns in Unnao district